Fire Force is an anime series based on the manga series of the same name written and illustrated by Atsushi Ōkubo. The series is animated by David Production and directed by Yuki Yase, with Yamato Haijima handling the series' scripts, Hideyuki Morioka designing the characters, and Kenichiro Suehiro composing the music.

The first opening theme is "Inferno" by Mrs. Green Apple and the first ending theme is "veil" by Keina Suda. The second opening theme is "Mayday" by Coldrain that features Ryo Kinoshita of Crystal Lake, and the second ending is "Nо̄nai" by Lenny code fiction.



Episode list

Home media release

Japanese

English

Notes

References

External links
  
 

Fire Force episode lists
2019 Japanese television seasons